Astronics Corporation is an American aerospace electronics corporation founded in 1968, headquartered in East Aurora, New York. It is known for lighting and electronics integrations on military, commercial, and business aircraft and semiconductor test systems.

Company
Astronics was founded in 1968 by Thomas L. Robinson, Sr., formerly of the Cornell Aeronautical Laboratory, to pursue commercial applications of electroluminescence.

Robert Keane (founder of Vistaprint and CEO of Cimpress) owns approximately 20% of Astronics' Class B stock and is a chairman of the board since 2019. Robert Keane worked at Astronics before founding Vistaprint and is also the son of former Astronics CEO (1972-2002) and chairman (1974-2019) Kevin Keane, who died in 2019

In 2010, Lufthansa Technik AG sued the AES division of Astronics over patent infringement with AES's EmPower system. In 2015, the suit was ruled in Lufthansa's favor in a Mannheim, Germany court. After appeals, Astronics was ordered to pay Lufthansa $3.2 million plus interest, which totalled $4.5 million at the end of 2019. A secondary suit from Lufthansa is expected to lead to a $16 million payment from Astronics. Lufthansa filed suits in UK, France, and USA; the USA lawsuit was dismissed.

In February 2016, the company approved a stock buyback program and purchased 1.675 million shares by 2017. Another buyback occurred in Q3 2019, leading to 1.823 million shares being repurchased. A third buyback occurred in Q4 2019 and Q1 2020, leading to 310,000 shares being repurchased for $8.5 million. In March 2020, the company had a $500 million revolving credit line, with $333 million loaned out of it.

During the COVID-19 pandemic in early 2020, Astronics wrote down $74 million, laid off 30% of employees, and froze wages. They also drew down an additional $150 million from their credit line.

Company brands and divisions include AES, AeroSat, Armstrong, ATS, Ballard, CCC, CSC, Diagnosys, DME, Freedom, LSI, Max-Viz, Peco, and PGA Electronic. Boeing accounted for 13.6% of their 2019 sales (14.3% in 2018, 16.8% in 2017), and Panasonic Avionics accounted for 13% of sales in 2019 (14.4% in 2018, 19.1% in 2017).

Astronics' sales in 2019 were $772.7 million, compared to $803.2 million in 2018.

Acquisitions and Divestitures
 Diagnosys Test Systems, $7 million, 2019
 Freedom Communication Technologies, $22 million, 2019, land mobile radio test equipment
 Divested semiconductor automatic test equipment division to Advantest, $185 million, 2018
 Telefonix Inc. and Product Development Technologies, $105 million, 2017
 Custom Control Concepts, 2017

Leadership history
 CEO
 Kevin Keane, 1972-2002 Chairman of the Board 2002-2019
 Peter Gundermann, 2003–present, Chairman of the board 2019–present Act

See also
 Abbreviated Test Language for All Systems
 Astronics Max-Viz

References

Aerospace companies of the United States
American companies established in 1968